Apex and Bionic are a Nigerian R&B duo of brothers Andrew Omokhudu and Daniel Omokhudu.
They released their debut single in 2014 titled Tell Them. In June 2019, they had a collaboration with Tuface titled For Your Matter. They are currently signed to JFK Resolute Entertainment Record Label.

They are also a  music figure in Nigeria music industry who has been credited for popularizing the Benin afro sound which made them gained their very first recognition from a major feature on LGTV Commercials when they modelled in 2013.

Career
AB was born and grew up in Benin City, but hail from Owan local government, both in Edo State. They started singing in 2010, but did not release a professional song until 2014, when their debut single Tell Them was released.

Bionic was also a part of a hip hop group called "MOCLAN". He was the leader of this band and his story was said to have dominated all street rap battles in the south from 2007-2011. He would rap using strange words and rhymes to create rap verses which was always shocking and unexpected while Apex on the other hand was a fitness model and a rapper but was mostly involved in hosting of events and rap battles alongside friends and they had the "open mic night" up until 2012 .

Growing up in Benin and its environment has been cited as one of their biggest influence since they started singing because it has prevented them from joining bad gangs in the society and most importantly it carved a different niche in the music industry.

In 2015, they released another single called Oshere. The following year 2016, saw the twins release their first album titled Nothing to Something, a ten track album. AB collaborated with Uhuru and Dj Maphorisa to make the song Get Down, one of the tracks listed on the album.

In May 2019, Apex and Bionic released a music video for their song Hold Up. In June 2019, AB and Tuface released a song For Your Matter which was dropped on the Apple iTunes music platform.

In November 2020, they announced  and released a fresh album and movie titled " Nobody Holy" .This Body of work Features 2face, Davido, OritseFemi Seyi Shay, and SlimCase. As cited by The nation, The album and movie expose the social ills and how difficult it is for an average young African to be upright considering the everyday struggles.

Discography

Studio albums
 2016: Nothing to Something (JFK Resolute Entertainment Music Label)
2020 : Nobody Holy (JFK Resolute Entertainment Music Label)

Singles
2014: Tell Them
 2015: Oshere 
 2016: Call Me
2016 : Escape 
 2016: Touch Your Toes
 2016: Get Down ft Uhuru, Dj Maphorisa
 2019: Hold Up
 2019: For Your Matter featuring 2Baba
2020 : Passmark featuring Slimcase

Controversies 
On 16 January 2020 Apex and Bionic caused a heavy stir across their social media platform where they posted some random Nudes of different girls. When the Pictures were posted they received various reactions from different Publics.

On 16 November 2020, Apex and Bionic claimed slimcase a Nigerian Musician stole their song “Passmark” while trying to record a single in the same studio they were using. This claim  really got the attention of a popular tv station in the country “Hip Tv” where they explained every single details of the claim.

When this got viral, a Comedian known as Ayo Makun reached out to both parties to make amend which worked out with his influence.

Selected Videography 

 2019 : Hold up

References 

Nigerian hip hop singers
Nigerian contemporary R&B musical groups
Living people
Nigerian twins
Twin musical duos
21st-century Nigerian male singers
The Headies winners
Nigerian boy bands
Male musical duos
Year of birth missing (living people)